Grigol Abashidze, or Grigory for short, was a Georgian poet known for works featuring Communist influences.

Early life
Abashidze was born on 1 August, 1914 [O.S. 19 July] in Chiatura, Georgia. He studied at the Tbilisi State University Faculty of Philology, where he graduated in 1936. In 1944, he joined the Communist Party of the Soviet Union (CPSU) and remained a lifelong member.

Literary life
Abashidze entered the literary scene in 1934 when his first work was published. Abashidze usually portrayed the common Soviet man in his works, like labourers and farmers. There was, too, the man who contributed to communism, like in his story "Forever in Armor" (1938) and 'The Founder' (1939).

Abashidze's reputation soared during the Patriotic War, when he brought out works such as "The Enemies" (1941), "The Duel of the Tanks" (1941), "The Banners" (1943), and "The Unconquerable Caucasus" (1943).

His "On the Southern Frontier" (1949) and "Lenin in Samgori" (1950) won him the State Prize of the USSR in 1951. His poem "George the Sixth" (1942) captures Georgia's struggle for independence. He wrote two other narrative poems, "The Legend of the First Dwellers in Tbilisi" (1959) and "Journey Into Three Times" (1961). He has also written two historical novels, Lasharela (1957) and The Long Night, which depict life in 13th-century Georgia. 

In 1967, Abashidze became the first secretary of the board of the Union of Writers of Georgia.

References

External link

1914 births
1994 deaths
20th-century male writers
20th-century poets from Georgia (country)
People from Imereti
People from Kutais Governorate
Heroes of Socialist Labour
Stalin Prize winners
Recipients of the Order of Lenin
Recipients of the Order of the Red Banner of Labour
Writers from Georgia (country)
Speculative fiction writers from Georgia (country)
Male poets from Georgia (country)

Burials at Didube Pantheon
Soviet poets
Soviet writers